The São Vicente Super Cup is a regional SuperCup competition played during the season in São Vicente Island, Cape Verde. The super cup competition is organized by the São Vicente Regional Football Association (Associação Regional de São Vicente de Futebol, ARSVF).  Its current champions is FC Derby who won their second title The regional champion competes with the cup champion.  The 2015 edition was held, as Mindelense won both the regional and cup titles, the regional winner competed with a runner up in the regional cup.

CS Mindelense has the most Super Cup titles with four, one ahead of  Batuque, second in totals in three. Third now in totals is FC Derby with two, Académica do Mindelo and Falcões do Norte are fourth and last with a title each.

FC Derby was the first Super Cup winner won in 2005. Batuque won two consecutive Super Cup titles in 2009 and 2010, Mindelense became the second to win two consecutive titles in 2015 and 2016. FC Derby won their second and recent title in 2017.

The 2018 edition which will take place later at the end of the season will feature the champion Mindelense and the cup winner Batuque.

Winners

1Mindelense was awarded 3-0 after Derby forfeited the Super Cup match

Performance By Club

See also
Sports in São Vicente, Cape Verde
São Vicente Premier Division
São Vicente Cup
São Vicente Association Cup

Notes

References

Sport in São Vicente, Cape Verde
Football cup competitions in Cape Verde
2004 establishments in Cape Verde